Andrew James Kenneth Stockdale (born 20 July 1976) is an Australian singer, musician, songwriter, and record producer. He is best known as the lead vocalist, lead guitarist, and only continuous member of the rock band Wolfmother.

Early life
Andrew James Stockdale was born in Brisbane on 20 July 1976. He was raised in Ashgrove and attended Ashgrove State School, The Gap State High School and Kelvin Grove State College. He briefly lived with his family in the Wimbledon Village area of London, where he attended Wimbledon Middle School, and holds dual Australian and British citizenship due to his father being an English man from Barrow-in-Furness.

Career

Wolfmother
Stockdale is best known as the lead vocalist, lead guitarist, and only continuous member of the rock band Wolfmother, which he founded in 2004. In 2007, he won "Songwriter of the Year" at the APRA Awards along with his bandmates.

On 24 October 2020, Stockdale performed "Joker & the Thief" at the AFL Grand Final.

Other work
Aside from his work with Wolfmother, Stockdale was featured on the 2010 single "By the Sword" by Slash, and released a solo album in 2013 called Keep Moving.

Artistry
Stockdale's influences most commonly include hard rock and heavy metal guitarists from the late 1960s and early 1970s. Vocally compared to a "cross between Robert Plant and Ozzy Osbourne" by Allmusic, his guitar antics and stage persona are commonly traced to Black Sabbath guitarist Tony Iommi.

Equipment

Stockdale plays Gibson guitars, primarily a 1974 SG standard with a Bigsby vibrato tailpiece in vintage sunburst. He has also been seen using a 1961 Reissue Gibson SG. Other times he uses a Gibson Dot Studio ES-335, a white Gibson Flying V and an alpine white Gibson EDS-1275 with golden hardware. For the recording of the Wolfmother album he used a borrowed Gibson ES-355 through a 1960s Marshall. When playing live, he uses a Vox AC30 and a Marshall JMP. In the past Stockdale has been noted to use Orange amplifiers and cabinets. Stockdale also states to use a Fender Stratocaster, though he prefers the Gibson guitars. In recent times he has also started using a Hohner Blues Master Harmonica microphone for some vocals.

Stockdale's current pedalboard consists of a Boss TU-2, Radial Tone Bone, Fulltone Clyde wah, a Fulltone Supa-Trem, an Electro-Harmonix Microsynth, an Electro-Harmonix Small Stone phaser, an AC booster, and a Digitech Whammy I (locked into place and set for a high octave.) All are patched into a true bypass looper/switcher array and are powered by a Voodoo Labs Pedal Power 2+.

Discography
Studio albums
Keep Moving (2013) AUS No. 32
Slipstream (2018) 
with Wolfmother
Wolfmother (2005)
Cosmic Egg (2009)
New Crown (2014)
Victorious (2016)
Rock'n'Roll Baby (2019)
Rock Out (2021)

Guest appearances
Slash – Slash on "By the Sword".
Beck's Record Club – Songs of Leonard Cohen
RocKwiz, shown on SBS on 3 October 2009. He played the Wolfmother song "New Moon Rising", then the Stevie Nicks/Don Henley song "Leather and Lace" as a duet with Holiday Sidewinder from Bridezilla.

Awards and nominations

APRA Awards
The APRA Awards are presented annually from 1982 by the Australasian Performing Right Association (APRA).

|-
|rowspan="2"| 2007 || Andrew Stockdale, Myles Heskett, Chris Ross || Songwriters of the Year || 
|-
| "Joker & the Thief" – Stockdale, Heskett, Ross || Song of the Year ||

References

Other sources
Browne, Sally, "On Wolf Patrol", The Courier Mail, 23 April 2006.

External links
 Wolfmother official website
 Wolfmother label page
 

1976 births
Living people
Australian people of English descent
Articles which contain graphical timelines
APRA Award winners
Australian heavy metal singers
Australian male singers
Australian rock guitarists
Australian rock singers
Grammy Award winners
Lead guitarists
RMIT University alumni
Wolfmother members
Australian male guitarists